Dharanidhor Basumatari was an Indian politician. He was elected to the Lok Sabha, lower house of the Parliament of India from the Kokrajhar in Assam in 1957, 1962, 1967 and 1971 as a member of the Indian National Congress.

References

External links
  Official biographical sketch in Parliament of India website 

Indian National Congress politicians
India MPs 1957–1962
India MPs 1962–1967
India MPs 1967–1970
India MPs 1971–1977
Lok Sabha members from Assam
1914 births
Year of death missing
People from Goalpara district
People from Kokrajhar district
Bodo people
Indian National Congress politicians from Assam